Gilan Deh (also Romanized as Gīlān Deh and Gīlāndeh) is a village in Kalkharan Rural District, in the Central District of Ardabil County, Ardabil Province, Iran. At the 2006 census, its population was 877, in 241 families.

References 

Towns and villages in Ardabil County